Vishal Singh (born 16 January 1974) is an Indian television and film actor. He made his soap debut with science fiction series Indradhanush in 1989 along with Karan Johar. He is most known for his role as Sanju in the comedy series, Dekh Bhai Dekh He was seen as Naitik in the hit soap opera Yeh Rishta Kya Kehlata Hai, airing on Star Plus.

Career 
Vishal Singh was born and brought up in Indore. He made his acting debut as a child actor in the 1982 film Rajput. In 1989, Singh made his television debut as part of the cast of the television show Indradhanush on DD, which was directed by Anand Mahendroo. The story was of four boys and their school life. After this show, Anand Mahendroo selected Singh for Dekh Bhai Dekh. In the 90s he also played an important role of Bilal in the famous serial Gul Gulshan Gulfaam, directed by Ved Rahi.
He had also appeared in the music videos Maikhane se Sharab se, by Pankaj Udhas, playing a drunkard and Sriram Iyer's Aisa Bhi Kabhi Hota Hai.

In 2011, he joined the cast of the TV series, Parvarrish - Kuchh Khattee Kuchh Meethi, playing the role of a father as Jeet Ahuja.

In 2016, he was finalized to portray the parallel lead role of Naitik Singhania in Star Plus's longest-running drama series Yeh Rishta Kya Kehlata Hai. About joining the popular show, he said "I am very excited to play the role of Naitik. Men like him are rarely found today and nothing better than playing an ideal man on screen who can definitely set an example. He is the perfect husband, father and son." In the show, he replaced actor Karan Mehra, who has played Naitik's character for almost seven years.

Filmography

Television

References

External links
 

Living people
Male actors from Indore
Indian male television actors
Indian male child actors
 1974 births
Male actors in Hindi cinema
Male actors in Hindi television
20th-century Indian male actors
21st-century Indian male actors